The 1953–54 New York Rangers season was the franchise's 28th season. The season saw the Rangers finish in fifth place in the National Hockey League (NHL) with a record of 29 wins, 31 losses, and 10 ties for 68 points.

Regular season

Final standings

Record vs. opponents

Schedule and results

|- align="center" bgcolor="#FFBBBB"
| 1 || 8 || @ Detroit Red Wings || 4–1 || 0–1–0
|- align="center" bgcolor="#CCFFCC"
| 2 || 11 || @ Chicago Black Hawks || 5–3 || 1–1–0
|- align="center" bgcolor="#FFBBBB"
| 3 || 15 || @ Montreal Canadiens || 6–1 || 1–2–0
|- align="center" bgcolor="white"
| 4 || 17 || @ Toronto Maple Leafs || 1–1 || 1–2–1
|- align="center" bgcolor="#FFBBBB"
| 5 || 18 || @ Boston Bruins || 3–2 || 1–3–1
|- align="center" bgcolor="#CCFFCC"
| 6 || 22 || Boston Bruins || 4–3 || 2–3–1
|- align="center" bgcolor="#FFBBBB"
| 7 || 25 || Montreal Canadiens || 2–1 || 2–4–1
|- align="center" bgcolor="#FFBBBB"
| 8 || 28 || Chicago Black Hawks || 6–1 || 2–5–1
|- align="center" bgcolor="#FFBBBB"
| 9 || 31 || @ Toronto Maple Leafs || 4–1 || 2–6–1
|-

|- align="center" bgcolor="white"
| 10 || 1 || Toronto Maple Leafs || 2–2 || 2–6–2
|- align="center" bgcolor="#FFBBBB"
| 11 || 5 || @ Montreal Canadiens || 4–3 || 2–7–2
|- align="center" bgcolor="#CCFFCC"
| 12 || 7 || @ Chicago Black Hawks || 3–1 || 3–7–2
|- align="center" bgcolor="white"
| 13 || 8 || @ Detroit Red Wings || 2–2 || 3–7–3
|- align="center" bgcolor="#CCFFCC"
| 14 || 11 || Chicago Black Hawks || 3–2 || 4–7–3
|- align="center" bgcolor="#FFBBBB"
| 15 || 14 || Detroit Red Wings || 3–2 || 4–8–3
|- align="center" bgcolor="#FFBBBB"
| 16 || 15 || @ Detroit Red Wings || 4–1 || 4–9–3
|- align="center" bgcolor="#CCFFCC"
| 17 || 18 || Chicago Black Hawks || 3–1 || 5–9–3
|- align="center" bgcolor="#FFBBBB"
| 18 || 21 || @ Toronto Maple Leafs || 1–0 || 5–10–3
|- align="center" bgcolor="#FFBBBB"
| 19 || 22 || Detroit Red Wings || 3–2 || 5–11–3
|- align="center" bgcolor="#CCFFCC"
| 20 || 25 || Boston Bruins || 5–3 || 6–11–3
|- align="center" bgcolor="#FFBBBB"
| 21 || 26 || @ Boston Bruins || 5–2 || 6–12–3
|- align="center" bgcolor="#CCFFCC"
| 22 || 29 || Montreal Canadiens || 2–1 || 7–12–3
|-

|- align="center" bgcolor="white"
| 23 || 2 || Chicago Black Hawks || 3–3 || 7–12–4
|- align="center" bgcolor="#FFBBBB"
| 24 || 3 || @ Detroit Red Wings || 4–0 || 7–13–4
|- align="center" bgcolor="#FFBBBB"
| 25 || 5 || @ Chicago Black Hawks || 2–1 || 7–14–4
|- align="center" bgcolor="white"
| 26 || 6 || Toronto Maple Leafs || 3–3 || 7–14–5
|- align="center" bgcolor="white"
| 27 || 9 || Detroit Red Wings || 3–3 || 7–14–6
|- align="center" bgcolor="#FFBBBB"
| 28 || 12 || @ Montreal Canadiens || 7–2 || 7–15–6
|- align="center" bgcolor="#FFBBBB"
| 29 || 13 || Toronto Maple Leafs || 2–1 || 7–16–6
|- align="center" bgcolor="#CCFFCC"
| 30 || 16 || Boston Bruins || 4–3 || 8–16–6
|- align="center" bgcolor="#FFBBBB"
| 31 || 19 || @ Toronto Maple Leafs || 3–2 || 8–17–6
|- align="center" bgcolor="#CCFFCC"
| 32 || 20 || Montreal Canadiens || 3–1 || 9–17–6
|- align="center" bgcolor="#CCFFCC"
| 33 || 23 || Detroit Red Wings || 2–1 || 10–17–6
|- align="center" bgcolor="#FFBBBB"
| 34 || 26 || @ Montreal Canadiens || 2–0 || 10–18–6
|- align="center" bgcolor="#FFBBBB"
| 35 || 27 || Chicago Black Hawks || 4–1 || 10–19–6
|- align="center" bgcolor="#FFBBBB"
| 36 || 29 || Boston Bruins || 6–2 || 10–20–6
|-

|- align="center" bgcolor="#CCFFCC"
| 37 || 1 || @ Boston Bruins || 2–1 || 11–20–6
|- align="center" bgcolor="#CCFFCC"
| 38 || 3 || Montreal Canadiens || 4–3 || 12–20–6
|- align="center" bgcolor="#CCFFCC"
| 39 || 6 || Chicago Black Hawks || 4–3 || 13–20–6
|- align="center" bgcolor="#CCFFCC"
| 40 || 10 || Toronto Maple Leafs || 4–1 || 14–20–6
|- align="center" bgcolor="#FFBBBB"
| 41 || 13 || Detroit Red Wings || 3–1 || 14–21–6
|- align="center" bgcolor="#CCFFCC"
| 42 || 14 || @ Chicago Black Hawks || 2–0 || 15–21–6
|- align="center" bgcolor="#FFBBBB"
| 43 || 16 || @ Toronto Maple Leafs || 4–0 || 15–22–6
|- align="center" bgcolor="#CCFFCC"
| 44 || 17 || @ Detroit Red Wings || 3–2 || 16–22–6
|- align="center" bgcolor="#CCFFCC"
| 45 || 20 || Boston Bruins || 8–3 || 17–22–6
|- align="center" bgcolor="#CCFFCC"
| 46 || 23 || @ Boston Bruins || 4–3 || 18–22–6
|- align="center" bgcolor="#FFBBBB"
| 47 || 24 || @ Boston Bruins || 2–1 || 18–23–6
|- align="center" bgcolor="white"
| 48 || 28 || @ Detroit Red Wings || 3–3 || 18–23–7
|- align="center" bgcolor="#CCFFCC"
| 49 || 30 || @ Montreal Canadiens || 2–1 || 19–23–7
|-

|- align="center" bgcolor="#CCFFCC"
| 50 || 4 || @ Chicago Black Hawks || 3–2 || 20–23–7
|- align="center" bgcolor="#FFBBBB"
| 51 || 6 || @ Montreal Canadiens || 4–3 || 20–24–7
|- align="center" bgcolor="#FFBBBB"
| 52 || 7 || Montreal Canadiens || 4–1 || 20–25–7
|- align="center" bgcolor="#CCFFCC"
| 53 || 10 || Detroit Red Wings || 3–2 || 21–25–7
|- align="center" bgcolor="#FFBBBB"
| 54 || 13 || @ Boston Bruins || 1–0 || 21–26–7
|- align="center" bgcolor="white"
| 55 || 14 || Toronto Maple Leafs || 3–3 || 21–26–8
|- align="center" bgcolor="#CCFFCC"
| 56 || 17 || Boston Bruins || 2–1 || 22–26–8
|- align="center" bgcolor="#CCFFCC"
| 57 || 19 || @ Chicago Black Hawks || 3–0 || 23–26–8
|- align="center" bgcolor="#CCFFCC"
| 58 || 21 || Toronto Maple Leafs || 6–1 || 24–26–8
|- align="center" bgcolor="#FFBBBB"
| 59 || 24 || Boston Bruins || 5–3 || 24–27–8
|- align="center" bgcolor="#FFBBBB"
| 60 || 27 || @ Montreal Canadiens || 5–0 || 24–28–8
|- align="center" bgcolor="#CCFFCC"
| 61 || 28 || Montreal Canadiens || 2–0 || 25–28–8
|-

|- align="center" bgcolor="white"
| 62 || 3 || @ Toronto Maple Leafs || 3–3 || 25–28–9
|- align="center" bgcolor="white"
| 63 || 5 || @ Chicago Black Hawks || 0–0 || 25–28–10
|- align="center" bgcolor="#FFBBBB"
| 64 || 7 || Toronto Maple Leafs || 4–0 || 25–29–10
|- align="center" bgcolor="#CCFFCC"
| 65 || 10 || Chicago Black Hawks || 4–2 || 26–29–10
|- align="center" bgcolor="#FFBBBB"
| 66 || 11 || @ Boston Bruins || 1–0 || 26–30–10
|- align="center" bgcolor="#CCFFCC"
| 67 || 13 || @ Detroit Red Wings || 5–2 || 27–30–10
|- align="center" bgcolor="#CCFFCC"
| 68 || 14 || Detroit Red Wings || 2–0 || 28–30–10
|- align="center" bgcolor="#CCFFCC"
| 69 || 20 || @ Toronto Maple Leafs || 5–2 || 29–30–10
|- align="center" bgcolor="#FFBBBB"
| 70 || 21 || Montreal Canadiens || 3–1 || 29–31–10
|-

Playoffs
The Rangers failed to qualify for the 1954 Stanley Cup playoffs.

Player statistics
Skaters

Goaltenders

†Denotes player spent time with another team before joining Rangers. Stats reflect time with Rangers only.
‡Traded mid-season. Stats reflect time with Rangers only.

References

External links
 Rangers on Hockey Database

New York Rangers seasons
New York Rangers
New York Rangers
New York Rangers
New York Rangers
Madison Square Garden
1950s in Manhattan